PS-99 Karachi East-I is a constituency of the Provincial Assembly of Sindh.

General elections 2018

General elections 2013

See also
 PS-98 Korangi Karachi-VII
 PS-100 Karachi East-II

References

External links
 Election commission Pakistan's official website
 Official Website of Government of Sindh

Constituencies of Sindh